Motoblur (often stylized as MOTOBLUR) was an Android UI replacement and push-based service focused on social networking, developed by Motorola. It aimed at functional similarity to Palm's Synergy, including such features as Remote Wipe. Motoblur included a variety of widgets which combined various social networking portals such as Facebook, MySpace, and Twitter as well as other services (news or weather reports) all in one place.  It also combined multiple email accounts and contact communication sources into singular notification views, being the first handset software to do so. Feeds and data were regularly pushed to these widgets. Motoblur in its final inception was on these devices: Electrify/Photon 4G, Atrix 4G, Atrix HD, CLIQ/DEXT, Backflip, Devour, Flipout, Charm, Spice, Droid Pro, Filpside, DEFY, DEFY+, Bravo, Droid X, Droid 3, Droid 2, Droid Bionic, and Droid RAZR. The version found on the Droid X, Droid Pro, Droid 2, Droid Bionic, Droid 3, Electrify/Photon 4G, and DEFY was intended to be less intrusive than previous versions.

First generation Motoblur-based phones required a new user to create a Motoblur account, denying access to the main screen until the account was established. User account information was stored on Motorola's redundant servers for access from web browsers and future phones. Newer devices allowed users to defer Blur services until a later registration and had more filtering options and better battery management to optimize the user experience.

In late 2010 Motorola announced that Motoblur would not be their development focus in the future, as Android made custom skins largely redundant. The Atrix, Droid 2 and Droid X do feature the UI skin.

In 2011 PC World criticised Motoblur for poor performance.

References 

Mobile software
Android (operating system) software